Mark Prettenthaler (born 11 April 1983) is a former Austrian footballer.

Honours
Pasching
Austrian Cup: 2012–13

References

External links
 

1983 births
Living people
Austrian footballers
Austria youth international footballers
Austrian expatriate footballers
SK Sturm Graz players
FC Augsburg players
Kapfenberger SV players
LASK players
SV Ried players
FC Juniors OÖ players
SC Wiener Neustadt players
SKN St. Pölten players
2. Bundesliga players
Austrian Football Bundesliga players
Austrian expatriate sportspeople in Germany
Expatriate footballers in Germany
Association football defenders